This list contains all spacewalks and moonwalks performed from 1965 to 1999 where an astronaut has fully or partially left a spacecraft. Entries for moonwalks are shown with a gray background while entries for all other EVAs are uncolored.

All spacewalks have had the astronauts tethered to their spacecraft except for seven spacewalks by the United States (six in 1984 using the Manned Maneuvering Unit, and one in 1994 testing the SAFER rescue device). All moonwalks were performed with astronauts untethered, and some of the astronauts traveled far enough to lose visual contact with their craft (they were up to 7.6 km away from it using the Lunar Roving Vehicle). One lunar EVA was not a moonwalk, but rather a stand-up EVA partially out the top hatch of the LM, where it was thought that the extra height would help with surveying the area prior to conducting the moonwalks. Only three deep-space EVAs have ever been conducted, where the activity was neither on the lunar surface nor in low Earth orbit, but far away from both the Moon and the Earth.

1965–1969 spacewalks and moonwalks
Spacewalk beginning and ending times are given in Coordinated Universal Time (UTC).
<onlyinclude>

1970–1979 spacewalks and moonwalks
Spacewalk beginning and ending times are given in Coordinated Universal Time (UTC).

1980–1984 spacewalks
Spacewalk beginning and ending times are given in Coordinated Universal Time (UTC).

1985–1989 spacewalks
Spacewalk beginning and ending times are given in Coordinated Universal Time (UTC).

1990–1994 spacewalks
Spacewalk beginning and ending times are given in Coordinated Universal Time (UTC).

1990 spacewalks

1991 spacewalks

1992 spacewalks

1993 spacewalks

1994 spacewalks

1995–1999 spacewalks
Spacewalk beginning and ending times are given in Coordinated Universal Time (UTC).

1995 spacewalks

1996 spacewalks

1997 spacewalks

1998 spacewalks
{| class="wikitable"
! style="background:#ccf;" | #
! style="background:#ccf;" | Spacecraft
! style="background:#ccf;" | Spacewalkers
! style="background:#ccf;" | Start (UTC)
! style="background:#ccf;" | End (UTC)
! style="background:#ccf;" | Duration
|-
| rowspan=2 |163.
| rowspan=2 |Mir PE-24 – EVA 6
|  Anatoly Solovyev Pavel Vinogradov
| 8 January 199823:08
| 9 January 199802:14
| 3 h 06 min
|-
| colspan=4 |When the spacewalk began, Solovyev and Vinogradov had only planned to inspect and film the damaged airlock sealing system, but the inspection showed that repairs could be made on-the-spot. After completing the repair, the spacewalking team used the Strela boom to move across Mir and recover the American optical monitoring experiment. Before closing out the spacewalk, the team also checked the integrity of cable connections to several antennas.
|-
| rowspan=2 |164.
| rowspan=2 |Mir PE-24 – EVA 7
|  Anatoly Solovyev David Wolf
| 14 January 199821:12
| 15 January 199801:04
| 3 h 52 min
|-
| colspan=4 |Solovyev continued to make repairs to the airlock hatch on Kvant-2. Wolf used a handheld photo-reflectometer to inspect the exterior surface of Mir. Solovyev spent some time supervising the actions of Wolf, as the latter had never performed an EVA before. The airlock pressure check made after the spacewalk showed that Solovyev's repairs were effective.
|-
| rowspan=2 |165.
| rowspan=2 |Mir PE-25 – EVA 1
|  Talgat Musabayev Nikolai Budarin
| 1 April 199813:35
| 1 April 199820:15
| 6 h 40 min
|-
| colspan=4 |In preparation for the repair of the damaged solar array, Musabayev and Budarin installed a set of handrails and one of two foot restraints on the outside of the Spektr module.
|-
| rowspan=2 |166.
| rowspan=2 |Mir PE-25 – EVA 2
|  Talgat Musabayev Nikolai Budarin
| 6 April 199813:35
| 6 April 199817:50
| 4 h 15 min
|-
| colspan=4 |Musabayev and Budarin set out to repair a damaged solar panel on the Spektr module. After installing a splint on the frayed panel, they had to quickly return to the airlock to handle a problem with the station's attitude control.
|-
| rowspan=2 |167.
| rowspan=2 |Mir PE-25 – EVA 3
|  Talgat Musabayev Nikolai Budarin
| 11 April 199809:55
| 11 April 199816:20
| 6 h 25 min
|-
| colspan=4 |Musabayev and Budarin removed and pushed off the external thruster engine (VDU) that had been located at the top of the Sofora boom. The team also recovered an experiment from the Rapana structure. The original plan to dismantle the Rapana structure was not completed and the structure remained in place.
|-
| rowspan=2 |168.
| rowspan=2 |Mir PE-25 – EVA 4
|  Talgat Musabayev Nikolai Budarin
| 17 April 199807:40
| 17 April 199814:13
| 6 h 33 min
|-
| colspan=4 |Musabayev and Budarin removed two structures and secured them to exterior surfaces. They then repositioned the new thrust engine (VDU) for future use.
|-
| rowspan=2 |169.
| rowspan=2 |Mir PE-25 – EVA 5
|  Talgat Musabayev Nikolai Budarin
| 22 April 199805:34
| 22 April 199811:55
| 6 h 21 min
|-
| colspan=4 |Musabayev and Budarin completed installation of the new VDU thruster unit on top of the Sofora boom.
|-
| rowspan=2 |170.
| rowspan=2 |Mir PE-26 – EVA 1
|  Gennady Padalka Sergei Avdeyev
| 15 September 199820:00
| 15 September 199820:30
| 0 h 30 min
|-
| colspan=4 |Padalka and Avdeyev conducted an internal spacewalk in the depressurized Spektr to connect electrical and control cables to the solar array servo motor.
|-
| rowspan=2 |171.
| rowspan=2 |Mir PE-26 – EVA 2
|  Gennady Padalka Sergei Avdeyev
| 10 November 199819:23
| 11 November 199801:18
| 5 h 55 min
|-
| colspan=4 |As soon as the spacewalk started, Padalka and Avdeyev deployed a mini-satellite, Spoutnik-41. The spacewalkers had a long list of experiment retrievals and deployments, which included a French "meteorite trap" intended to catch some dust from the upcoming Leonids meteor shower.
|-
| rowspan=2 |172.
| rowspan=2 |STS-88 – EVA 1
|  Jerry Ross James Newman
| 7 December 199822:10
| 8 December 199805:31
| 7 h 21 min
|-
| colspan=4 |Ross and Newman connected computer and electrical cables between the Unity node, the two mating adapters attached to either end of Unity, and the Zarya Functional Cargo Block (FGB).
|-
| rowspan=2 |173.
| rowspan=2 |STS-88 – EVA 2
|  Jerry Ross James Newman
| 9 December 199820:33
| 10 December 199803:35
| 7 h 02 min
|-
| colspan=4 |Ross and Newman installed two box-like antennas on the outside of the Unity module that were part of the station's S-band early communications system.
|-
| rowspan=2|174.
| rowspan=2|STS-88 – EVA 3
|  Jerry Ross James Newman
| 12 December 199820:33
| 13 December 199803:32
| 6 h 59 min
|-
| colspan=4|Ross and Newman checked on an insulation cover on a cable connection on the lower Pressurized Mating Adapter (PMA 2) to ensure its proper installation, attached EVA tools on the side of Unity'''s upper mating adapter (PMA 1) in preparation for future EVAs, and inspected Orbiter Space Vision System targets on Unity.
|}

1999 spacewalksFor spacewalks that took place from 2000 through 2014, see List of spacewalks 2000–2014.For spacewalks that took place from the beginning of 2015 on, see List of spacewalks since 2015.

 Commemorative stamps

The first spacewalk, that of the Soviet cosmonaut Alexei Leonov was commemorated in several Eastern Bloc stamps (see the stamps section in the Alexei Leonov article). Since the Soviet Union did not distribute diagrams or images of the Voskhod 2 spacecraft at the time, the spaceship depiction in the stamps was purely fictional. In 1967 the U.S. Post Office issued a pair of postage stamps commemorating the first American to float freely in space while orbiting the Earth. The engraved image has accurate depictions of the Gemini IV spacecraft and the space suit worn by astronaut Ed White.

Two Forever Stamps were issued in 2019 to commemorate the first spacewalks 50th anniversary. One features an iconic image of Buzz Aldrin performing an EVA, and the other of the Moon as viewed from Apollo 11 in space. 

See also

List of spacewalkers
List of cumulative spacewalk records
Space capsule
Space exploration
Space suit 
U.S. space exploration history on U.S. stamps

References

External links
NASA list of EVA statistics (May not be updated)
U. S. Human Spaceflight History
NASA JSC Oral History Project
"Boomers collect artifacts, memories of NASA's heyday": Historical moonwalk information
What we didn't know about the Moonwalk: The Back Story behind that 'One Small Step' from NBC News''

Spaceflight timelines
20th century-related lists
 1965